Jo (died 24 January 1652) of the , widely known as  Jo, was a concubine of King Injo of Joseon. She is one of the best-known femme fatales in Korean history.

Biography

Early life 
She was initially arranged to become the maid of a lord's daughter, but instead became a palace woman. She used to serve Queen Inryeol's brother-in-law, and the Queen was the one who arranged for her to enter the palace.

Royal favorite

No one could beat her in terms of receiving the King’s affection; both Queen Jangryeol of the Yangju Jo clan and  Jang  failed to receive Injo’s love.

Her personality was described as that of a sensual but cunning woman, and those who were in her bad book would not be safe in front of the King. Because of this, people inside the palace were very afraid of her. It was rumored that Lady Jo disturbed the relationship between Injo and Queen Jangryeol, with the intention to tear them apart.

Feud with the crown princess
Lady Jo harbored hatred towards the family of Yi Wang, Crown Prince Sohyeon, particularly Crown Princess Minhoe. Although there was no record of her involvement with Crown Prince Sohyeon’s death, her slanders did not stop after the prince passed away. Because of that, Crown Princess Minhoe suspected Jo of poisoning her husband.

Lady Jo accused the Crown Princess of attempting to poison Injo, leading to the princess’ execution. The acupuncturist who treated Prince Sohyeon before his death was Yi Hyeong-ik, who was rumored to be in a relationship with Lady Jo's mother. There was even a record about this.

Later life
After Injo's death, she was discovered to be involved in an attempt to put a curse on Queen Jangryeol and on the Queen's niece. Kim Ja-jeom was her accomplice and was executed. King Hyojong decided to spare the life of Princess Hyomyeong, his half-sister, since she was not involved in the incident. Lady Jo was sentenced to death by poisoning and her mother, who was also an accomplice, died before she could receive her punishment. There were officials suggesting for Jo to be stripped of her position as a royal consort but out of respect for his father, who treasured her, King Hyojong did not go through with the idea.

She had a daughter and two sons with King Injo.

Family
Father: Jo Gi (1574 – ?) (조기)
Mother: Han Ok, Lady Han of the Cheongju Han clan (? – 1652) (한옥, 청주 한씨)
Husband: Yi Jong, King Injo of Joseon (7 December 1595 – 17 June 1649) (이종 조선 인조)
Father-in-law: Grand Internal Prince Jeongwon (2 August 1580 – 29 December 1619) (정원 대원군)
Mother-in-law: Queen Inheon of the Neungseong Gu clan (17 April 1578 – 14 January 1626) (인헌왕후 능성 구씨)
 Daughter: Princess Hyomyeong (1637 – 1700) (효명옹주)
 Son-in-law: Kim Se-ryong, Prince Consort Nakseong (? – 1651) (김세룡 낙성위)
 Son: Yi Jing, Prince Sungseon (17 October 1639 – 6 January 1690) (이징 숭선군)
 Daughter-in-law: Princess Consort Yeongpung of the Pyeongsan Shin clan (1639 – 1692) (영풍군부인 평산 신씨)
 Granddaughter: Lady Yi (이씨)
 Granddaughter: Lady Yi (이씨)
 Granddaughter: Lady Yi (이씨)
 Granddaughter: Lady Yi (이씨)
 Grandson: Yi Hang, Prince Dongpyeong (동평군 항) (1660 - 1701)
 Grandson: Yi Kang (동성정 강)
Son: Yi Suk, Prince Nakseon (9 December 1641 – 26 April 1695) (이숙 낙석군)
 Daughter-in-law: Princess Consort Dongwon of the Gangneung Kim clan (동원군부인 강릉 김씨) (? - 1722)
 Adoptive grandson: Yi Hwan, Prince Imyang (임양군 이환) (1656 - 1715)

In popular culture
 Portrayed by Seo Hyun-jin in the 2012 MBC TV series Horse Doctor.
 Portrayed by Kim Hyun-joo, Lee Chae-mi and Heo Jung-eun in the 2013 JTBC TV series Blooded Palace: The War of Flowers.
 Portrayed by Kim Min-seo in the 2015 MBC TV series Splendid Politics.
 Portrayed by Ahn Eun-jin in the 2022 film The Night Owl.

Notes

References

1652 deaths
Royal consorts of the Joseon dynasty
Executed Korean women
1617 births